Syria is a country in Western Asia. It is a unitary republic consisting of 14 governorates and is the only country that politically espouses Ba'athism. Since March 2011, Syria has been embroiled in an armed conflict, with a number of countries in the region and beyond being involved militarily or otherwise. Political instability poses a significant threat to future economic development. Foreign investment is constrained by violence, government restrictions, economic sanctions, and international isolation. Syria's economy also remains hobbled by state bureaucracy, falling oil production, rising budget deficits, and inflation.

Notable firms 
This list includes notable companies with primary headquarters located in the country. The industry and sector follow the Industry Classification Benchmark framework. Organizations which have ceased operations are included and noted as defunct.

See also 
 List of airlines of Syria
 List of banks in Syria

References 

Syria